Frankie John Raymond (born 18 November 1992) is an English footballer who plays as a midfielder for Dulwich Hamlet.

Career
Raymond started his youth career at Wimbledon before joining Millwall. He then joined Reading's academy. In December 2010, he joined Isthmian League Premier Division side Horsham on loan, making his debut a month later in a 3–1 win over Kingstonian. He scored his only goal for the club in a 4–2 win over Hassocks in the Sussex Senior Cup, with a speculative effort from outside the box. He returned to Reading at the end of the month having made five appearances scoring once. In February 2011, he signed for Conference South side Basingstoke Town on loan until the end of the season, making seven appearances. In August 2011, he joined Conference South side Eastleigh on an initial one-month loan. In his fourth appearance for the club, he was sent off for an alleged headbutt against Tonbridge Angels and received a three-match ban. Prior to that incident, Eastleigh manager Ian Baird had looked into the opportunity of extending the loan until the end of the season, however his loan was cut short in September 2011. In October 2011, he joined Southern Football League Division One South & West side Hungerford Town on loan. In May 2012, he was released by Reading following the club's promotion to the Premier League.

In September 2012, he joined Football League Two side Gillingham on a non-contract basis and joined the club's development squad, having featured for the side in pre-season friendlies. His stay at the club was short-lived as he went on to sign for Conference South side Eastbourne Borough on a free transfer. He was a first team regular for Eastbourne during his two years at the club, as the side finished regularly in mid-table, making seventy appearances and scoring three goals. In July 2014, he signed for League Two side Dagenham & Redbridge for an undisclosed fee, signing a one-year contract with the option of a second year, having featured for the side in pre-season. He made his professional debut for the club in a 2–0 defeat to local rivals Leyton Orient in the Football League Trophy, replacing Abu Ogogo as a late substitute. In November 2014 after finding it difficult to break into the first team, he was loaned back to former Conference South club Eastbourne Borough on an initial one-month loan deal. In December 2014, his loan was extended for a further month, having made seven appearances during his loan spell. Then for a third consecutive month the deal was extended again for one more month. In May 2017 after three years at Dagenham, Raymond was released following the expiry of his contract.

Soon after, Raymond joined his local side Bromley. 

On 1 July 2021, Raymond joined Boreham Wood on a two-year deal after four seasons with Bromley.

On 8 July 2022, Raymond joined National League South club Dulwich Hamlet.

Career statistics

Honours
Bromley
FA Trophy runner-up: 2017–18

References

External links
Frankie Raymond profile at Dagenham & Redbridge F.C.

1992 births
Living people
English footballers
People from Chislehurst
Association football midfielders
Reading F.C. players
Horsham F.C. players
Basingstoke Town F.C. players
Eastleigh F.C. players
Hungerford Town F.C. players
Gillingham F.C. players
Eastbourne Borough F.C. players
Dagenham & Redbridge F.C. players
Bromley F.C. players
Boreham Wood F.C. players
Dulwich Hamlet F.C. players
National League (English football) players
Isthmian League players
Southern Football League players
English Football League players